The Holden SSX is a concept sports–hatchback prototype car based on the Holden VY Commodore, with a more aggressive edge. The front has a bold, deeper fascia with twin projector headlights, foglamps and an exclusive front grille. The back is totally redesigned and features a deep, aggressive bumper and blackened taillights, plus hatchback entry, making it (Rover SD1 and Holden Torana aside) one of the world's first V8 hatchback cars. The car features a "Kryptonite" green metallic paint job, with a black and silver interior. The dials light up in a deep red when lights are on. The car is a concept only; it formed part of the extensive Holden display at the Sydney International Motor Show from October 18 to October 27, 2002.

Engine
The SSX is powered by a Generation III/Holden 5.7 L V8 engine generating  through all four wheels. This is done though Holden's "crossXtrac" all-wheel drive system, also featured on the Holden Crewman ute, Adventra wagon, HSV Avalanche and HSV Coupé 4.

References

SSX